Gérard Karsenty is a professor and chair of the Genetics and Development Department at the Columbia University Medical Center
where he studies the endocrinology of bone.

In 2010 Karsenty won the Richard Lounsbery Award for his work on the molecular mechanisms that underlie the formation and the remodeling of bone. In 2016 he won the Roy O. Greep Laureate Award.

References

External links 

Columbia University faculty
University of Paris alumni
Living people
Year of birth missing (living people)
Richard-Lounsbery Award laureates
Members of the National Academy of Medicine